Shad Clayton Williams (born March 10, 1971) is an American former professional baseball pitcher who played for two seasons. He played for the California/Anaheim Angels of Major League Baseball (MLB) for 13 games during the 1996 season and one game during the 1997 season.

External links

1971 births
Living people
American expatriate baseball players in Canada
Anaheim Angels players
Arkansas Travelers players
Baseball players from California
Brockton Rox players
Calgary Outlaws players
California Angels players
Columbus Clippers players
Edmonton Trappers players
Fort Worth Cats players
Fresno City Rams baseball players
Major League Baseball pitchers
Midland Angels players
Norwich Navigators players
Quad Cities River Bandits players
Reading Phillies players
Salt Lake Stingers players
Scranton/Wilkes-Barre Red Barons players
Sportspeople from Fresno, California
Vancouver Canadians players
American expatriate baseball players in Taiwan
Macoto Gida players
Alaska Goldpanners of Fairbanks players